Helen Dallimore (born 31 October 1971) is an Australian actress, known for originating the role of Glinda in the West End production of Wicked.

Early life
Dallimore grew up in Oxford, England and Sydney, Australia.  She trained at the National Institute of Dramatic Art in Sydney, graduating in 1995. She was awarded a Mike Walsh Fellowship in 2002.

Dallimore's parents are academics and she has one brother.

Career

Theatre
Dallimore's credits with the Sydney Theatre Company include: David Edgar's Pentecost, The Unlikely Prospect of Happiness, Andrew Upton and Gale Edwards' The Hanging Man, and "Miss Adelaide" in Guys and Dolls. She also created the role of "Simone" in Up for Grabs, later played by Madonna in the West End.

She made her West End debut as Glinda in the original London cast of the musical Wicked. Previews began on 7 September 2006 with an opening night of 27 September. She starred alongside Idina Menzel and later Kerry Ellis as Elphaba. She played her final performance on 14 July 2007 and was replaced by Dianne Pilkington. She was asked to reprise the role in the original Australian production of the show but declined.

She then appeared in the comedy Boeing Boeing in Australia and filled in for a sick cast member in the Sydney 2008 Wharf Revue. In July/August 2009 she starred in the ill-fated Ernest Hemingway musical Too Close to the Sun at the West End's Comedy Theatre. She went on to appear in the 2009 Wharf Revue in Sydney, followed by the Australian production of Spring Awakening with the Sydney Theatre Company in February/March 2010.

Dallimore played Cinderella in the London Open Air Theatre production of Into the Woods, which ran from 6 August – 11 September 2010.

In 2012, she originated the role of Paulette Bonafonte in the Australian premiere of Legally Blonde The Musical. For this role, she won the 2013 Helpmann Award for Best Female Actor in a Supporting Role in a Musical.

Dallimore starred as Mrs Johnstone in the Australian revival of Blood Brothers in Sydney and Melbourne, and was nominated for a Helpmann Award for her performance. She would go on to win a Colleen Clifford Memorial Award for Best Actor in a Music Theatre (female) at the 2015 Glug Awards.

In 2019 Dallimore starred as Judy Garland in The State Theatre Company of South Australia production of End of the Rainbow

Film and television
Dallimore's film and television work includes Mr. Accident, Mumbo Jumbo, Kangaroo Jack, The Day of the Roses, Two Heads Creek, and The Extra.  She also featured alongside Glenn Close and Harry Connick, Jr. in the 2001 television remake of the Rodgers and Hammerstein musical, South Pacific. She appeared in an episode of the UK television crime drama Midsomer Murders entitled Last Year's Model.

Dallimore worked for children's television and provided the voice of Panda in the popular children's TV series Magic Mountain for ABC TV. She also appears in the 2009 sketch comedy television series Double Take.

She has also appeared in a series of TV commercials for All-Bran cereal, also featuring fellow actress and comedian Julia Morris.

In the summer of 2010, Helen appeared in Home and Away as Mitzy, a friend of Marilyn Chambers, and a psychic who arrived in Summer Bay, reminding Marilyn of her "end date".  Mitzy later revealed to Marilyn that she was dying of lung cancer.  A second tumour travelled to her brain and she later died of a stroke brought on by an argument with Marilyn.

References

External links

Australian people of English descent
National Institute of Dramatic Art alumni
Australian television actresses
Australian musical theatre actresses
Actresses from Melbourne
Helpmann Award winners
1971 births
Living people
21st-century Australian actresses